Woodyates is a hamlet, sometimes considered a village, in the county of Dorset, near its border with Wiltshire, in the west of England.

History
The name means "wood gates" and is believed to refer to the position of Woodyates at the entrance to the wooded area of Cranborne Chase.

The topographer James Bell described it thus in 1835:

The Roman road (Ackling Dyke) is especially well preserved. In Highways and Byways in Dorset (1935), Sir Frederick Treves notes that "In no part of Dorset can the actual undisturbed Roman road be seen at greater advantage or for greater extent than about Woodyates."

A Romano-British defensive ditch called Bokerley Dyke also runs near the village.

The estate contained an important coaching inn, once called the Woodyates Inn, later the Shaftesbury Arms. This was a staging point of the Trafalgar Way, and a commemorative plaque can be seen there.

In the 18th century, Woodyates was a property of Thomas Pitt.

Woodyates was the site of the training establishment of William Day, who sent out the winners of many important horse races including Foxhall, winner of the Grand Prix de Paris, Cesarewitch and Cambridgeshire in 1881.

Notes

External links

Hamlets in Dorset